Otsdawa Baptist Church is a historic Free Will Baptist church on City Road 8 in Otsdawa, Otsego County, New York. It was built in 1840 and is a one-story rectangular building, three bays wide and three bays deep.  The building is of wood-frame construction with clapboard siding.  It sits on a stone foundation with a gable roof in the Greek Revival style.  The roof is surmounted by a two-stage tower with a small spire.

It was listed on the National Register of Historic Places in 2002.

References

Baptist churches in New York (state)
Churches on the National Register of Historic Places in New York (state)
Greek Revival church buildings in New York (state)
Churches completed in 1840
19th-century Baptist churches in the United States
Churches in Otsego County, New York
National Register of Historic Places in Otsego County, New York